Kertomesis anthracosema is a moth in the family Autostichidae. It was described by Edward Meyrick in 1933. It is found in Kashmir.

References

Moths described in 1933
Kertomesis
Taxa named by Edward Meyrick